Effiom Ekeng Edet  is a Nigerian politician from the PDP.

Political career 
He was elected to the Cross River State House of Assembly in a by-election in Akpabuyo in 2022. The by-election was triggered by the death of incumbent legislator Elizabeth Ironbar.

References 

Living people
Peoples Democratic Party (Nigeria) politicians
People from Cross River State
21st-century Nigerian politicians
Year of birth missing (living people)
Members of the Cross River State House of Assembly